The 1991–92 Pilkington Cup was the 21st edition of England's premier rugby union club competition at the time. Bath won the competition defeating Harlequins in the final. The event was sponsored by Pilkington and the final was held at Twickenham Stadium.

Draw and results

First round

Second round

Third round

Fourth round

Quarter-finals

Semi-finals

Final

References

1991-92 
1991–92 rugby union tournaments for clubs
1991–92 in English rugby union